Kyle Flanagan may refer to:
 Kyle Flanagan (ice hockey)
 Kyle Flanagan (rugby league)